Thomas Robert Limerick (January 7, 1902 – May 23, 1938) was an American criminal, who took part in the third documented escape attempt from Alcatraz Island on the night of May 23, 1938.

Biography 
Thomas Limerick was born on January 7, 1902 in Council Bluffs, Iowa. He grew up in a middle-class family until his father died when he was 15. His family was soon thrown into poverty and left Thomas, the oldest of 5 children, to get a job. Originally a boxcar bandit, he joined a gang of bank robbers headed by Maurice Denning based in Gage County, Nebraska in 1934. On August 23, 1934 the gang robbed a National Guard Armory, and between October and November of that year, robbed large banks in Hawarden, Iowa, Dell Rapids, South Dakota and Superior, Nebraska. They kidnapped three people during one of the robberies. Limerick was arrested in a nightclub in St. Joseph, Missouri on May 25, 1935, and eventually sentenced to life imprisonment at Leavenworth Penitentiary, but later transferred to Alcatraz.

Alcatraz escape attempt
In the spring of 1938, Limerick, James Lucas, and Rufus Franklin planned an escape from Alcatraz. Their escape plan began by incapacitating an unarmed guard supervising a work detail on the top floor. Once the supervisor was rendered unconscious, the convicts would escape through a window to the rooftop, where they would incapacitate an armed guard and leave the island via a seized police boat. They enacted their escape plan on May 23, 1938 in the prison's mat shop, where they assaulted Custodial Officer Royal Cline with hammer blows to his head. They proceeded to the roof, where an armed guard shot both Franklin and Limerick, although Lucas wasn't shot. Other guards arrived at the scene. Franklin, Limerick, and Lucas were cornered and surrendered to the guards.

Cline died of his injuries the next day, as did Limerick. Lucas and the other surviving convict, Rufus Franklin, were tried for murder and sentenced to life imprisonment.

See also 
List of Alcatraz escape attempts

References

External links
 Escapes from Alcatraz 
 News Article about Limericks' Life as a Bandit
 Photo of his grave, showing birth and death dates

1902 births
1938 deaths
American prisoners sentenced to life imprisonment
American escapees
Escapees from United States federal government detention
Deaths by firearm in California
Inmates of Alcatraz Federal Penitentiary
American people who died in prison custody
Prisoners who died in United States federal government detention
People shot dead by law enforcement officers in the United States
American people convicted of robbery
Prisoners sentenced to life imprisonment by the United States federal government
People convicted under the Federal Kidnapping Act